The 15th Robert Awards ceremony was held in 1998 in Copenhagen, Denmark. Organized by the Danish Film Academy, the awards honoured the best in Danish and foreign film of 1997.

Honorees

Best Danish Film 
 Barbara by Nils Malmros & Let's Get Lost by Jonas Elmer

Best Screenplay 
  - Eye of the Eagle

Best Actor in a Leading Role 
 Lars Simonsen – Barbara

Best Actress in a Leading Role 
 Sidse Babett Knudsen – Let's Get Lost

Best Actor in a Supporting Role 
 Jesper Christensen – Barbara

Best Actress in a Supporting Role 
 Ellen Hillingsø – Sekten

Best Cinematography 
 Jan Weincke – Barbara

Best Production Design 
 Norbert Scherer – Øen i Fuglegaden

Best Costume Design 
 Manon Rasmussen – Eye of the Eagle

Best Makeup 
 Elisabeth Bukkehave – Eye of the Eagle

Robert Award for Best Light 
 Otto Stenov – Barbara

Best Sound Design 
 Morten Degnbol & Stig Sparre-Ulrich – Eye of the Eagle

Best Editing 
 Morten Giese, Jakob Thuesen & Per K. Kirkegaard for Eye of the Eagle & Sekten

Best Score 
  & Povl Kristian – Let's Get Lost

Best Documentary Short 
 Patriotene – Tómas Gislason

Best Short Featurette 
 Royal Blues – Lotte Svendsen

Non-American Film 
 The Full Monty – Peter Cattaneo

Special Jury Prize (Short) 
 Henning Bahs

See also 

 1998 Bodil Awards

References

External links 
  

1997 film awards
1998 in Denmark
Robert Awards ceremonies
1990s in Copenhagen